Daniel Peter O'Herlihy (May 1, 1919 – February 17, 2005) was an Irish actor of film, television and radio. With a distinguished appearance and rich, resonant speaking voice, O'Herlihy's best-known roles included his Oscar-nominated portrayal of the lead character in Luis Buñuel's Robinson Crusoe (1954), Brigadier General Warren A. Black in Fail Safe (1964), Marshal Ney in Waterloo (1970), Conal Cochran in Halloween III: Season of the Witch (1982), Grig in The Last Starfighter in (1984), "The Old Man" in RoboCop (1987) and its 1990 sequel, and Andrew Packard in the television series Twin Peaks (1990–91).

Early life and education
O'Herlihy was born in Wexford, County Wexford in 1919, but moved with his family to Dublin when he was young. He was educated at Christian Brothers College in Dún Laoghaire and later studied at University College Dublin, graduating in 1944 with a degree in architecture, following in his father's footsteps.

He developed a keen interest in acting during his university studies. He joined several amateur theatre groups and joined the Abbey Theatre as a bit player. After graduating from the university, he decided to pursue acting full-time, working at the Abbey and Gate Theatre, first as a set designer, then later as an actor.

Career

O'Herlihy's first acting role came in 1944, when he played the lead in the Gate's production of Red Roses For Me, written and directed by Seán O'Casey. He appeared in some fifty plays at the Gate. He made his film debut in Carol Reed's Odd Man Out in 1947, which was shot on-location in Belfast, and also worked extensively in radio. His first American film role was as Macduff in Orson Welles' version of Macbeth (1948).

In 1952, he starred in the Red Scare film Invasion, U.S.A. and, in 1954 in Luis Buñuel's Robinson Crusoe, which earned him an Academy Award nomination for Best Actor. O'Herlihy recalled that the producers of the film wanted Buñuel to use Orson Welles for the role, with Buñuel refusing, saying he was too big and too fat. They arranged a screening of Welles' Macbeth to show how a bearded Welles would look but Buñuel demanded O'Herlihy who appeared in the film.

O'Herlihy was later featured in The Young Land in 1959 as Judge Millard Isham. In 1960, he played Sir Harry Ivers, an upper-class English drifter who joins Alan Ladd in a plot to ruin an Arizona cattle town by robbing its bank in the western One Foot in Hell. In 1964, he starred in Fail Safe in the role of General Black, or "Blackie". In 1969, he was cast in The Big Cube and 100 Rifles. In 1970, he starred in the epic Waterloo, playing the part of Michel Ney, the marshal of France. In 1982, he starred in Halloween III: Season of the Witch as Conal Cochran and in 1984, he appeared in The Last Starfighter as Grig, Alex Rogan's reptilian co-pilot, navigator and sidekick. In 1986's The Whoopee Boys he played a judge and in 1987, he appeared in RoboCop as "The Old Man". That same year, he was cast in John Huston's The Dead. In 1990, he appeared in RoboCop 2, the sequel to the 1987 film.

O'Herlihy had a fairly extensive career in television, having appeared on Rawhide, The DuPont Show with June Allyson, Adventures in Paradise and Target: The Corruptors!. He portrayed Larry "Ace" Banner in the first season of The Untouchables in the episode titled "The Big Squeeze". He was cast as Stephen Jordan in the last season of Checkmate episode " "Referendum on Murder". He also appeared on The Americans and The Man from U.N.C.L.E. in the episodes "The Fiddlesticks Affair" and "The Yo-Ho-Ho and a Bottle of Rum Affair" and on Route 66 in the episode "To Walk with the Serpent". In 1962, he was cast as Glenn Kassin in "The Earth Mover" episode of Empire. He appeared on Bonanza (episode: "The Artist" as Matthew Raine).

In 1963–1964, he was in The Travels of Jaimie McPheeters. On The Long, Hot Summer, O'Herlihy became the lead star, having replaced Edmond O'Brien in the part of Will Varner midway through the program's single-season run. In 1966, he appeared in the episode "Have You Seen the Aurora Borealis?" of The Road West, starring Barry Sullivan. In 1974, he appeared in QB VII and played the Senior American Officer, Col. Max Dodd in the second series of BBC's POW drama Colditz. In 1976, he guest-starred in an episode of Gibbsville. In 1978, he guest-starred in the second part of the Battlestar Galactica episode "Gun on Ice Planet Zero" as Dr. Ravishol. O'Herlihy also portrayed the ill-fated lumber tycoon Andrew Packard in the cult television program Twin Peaks (1991) and in the Batman: The Animated Series episode "Deep Freeze", voicing the villainous theme park mogul Grant Walker. In 1998, O'Herlihy acted in his last film, The Rat Pack, playing Joseph P. Kennedy Sr.

Personal life
Dan O'Herlihy married Elsie Bennett in 1945. He was the brother of director Michael O'Herlihy and the father of actor Gavan O'Herlihy, visual artist Olwen O'Herlihy and architect Lorcan O'Herlihy. He and his wife had nine grandchildren and six great-grandchildren. One grandchild, Mica O'Herlihy, is a filmmaker whose work has been shown at the Sundance Film Festival. Another, Alana O'Herlihy, is a photographer and director who has collaborated with Miley Cyrus.

O'Herlihy became a naturalized U.S. citizen in 1983.

Death
O'Herlihy died of natural causes in Malibu, California in 2005, aged 85. His personal papers are held in the University College Dublin Archives.

Complete filmography

References

External links

 O'Herlihy in The Long Hot Summer (1965–66), youtube.com; accessed September 3, 2015.

1919 births
2005 deaths
Alumni of University College Dublin
American male film actors
American male television actors
American male radio actors
Male actors from Dublin (city)
Irish male film actors
Irish male television actors
Irish male radio actors
Actors from County Wexford
California Democrats
Naturalized citizens of the United States
Irish emigrants to the United States
20th-century American male actors
People educated at C.B.C. Monkstown
People from Wexford, County Wexford
20th-century Irish male actors